Black Saddle is an American Western television series starring Peter Breck that aired 44 episodes on NBC from January 10, 1959, to May 6, 1960. The half-hour program was produced by Dick Powell's Four Star Television, and the original backdoor pilot was an episode of CBS's Dick Powell's Zane Grey Theatre, with Chris Alcaide originally portraying the principal character, Clay Culhane.

Synopsis
Detailed in the second episode of season two ("The Saddle"), series star Peter Breck's character, Clay Culhane, is a gunfighter who becomes a lawyer after his two brothers are killed in a bushwhack. Clay is seriously injured, but survives thanks to a man called McKinney, who nurses him back to health. McKinney turns out to be a former judge, who retired after sentencing one of his own sons to death for murder. Under McKinney, Culhane decides that his life should take a different direction, and studies the judge's law books. He is further taught court procedure by the judge. A year later, having been taught by the ex-judge, he passes a verbal examination and becomes a lawyer. His mentor is then killed by his other son, who hates his father for sentencing his twin brother to death.

In the episode "Client Neal Adams" (May 9, 1959), James Drury (more than three years before the premiere of his own series The Virginian on NBC) guest-stars as Neal Adams, an old friend of Culhane's who has robbed a bank of $8,000. Shot in the back by a pursuing bounty hunter, played by Charles Aidman, Adams asks Culhane for help. Adams claims that the bounty hunter is the brother of a man whom Adams had earlier killed in self-defense. From the start, Marshal Scott doubts Adams' story and questions Culhane's judgment in the matter. 

In "Client Peter Warren" (October 30, 1959), John Lupton, a year after the close of his Broken Arrow Western series, plays a man accused by townspeople of starting a fire that caused the death of his estranged wife's wealthy and respected aunt. The motive is inheritance of joint property from the aunt's pending estate. Culhane agrees to defend Warren, but instead finds evidence that Warren had been present at the scene of the fire. Ed Nelson portrays Lee Coogan, a hot-headed man and a former suitor of Mrs. Warren, played by Aneta Corsaut. Coogan is also determined to show Warren's guilt. 

In "Apache Trail" (November 20, 1959), Culhane and Nora go to an Indian outpost to collect a debt owed to her. There, they encounter Sam King (DeForest Kelley), accused of defrauding tribesmen. King is beaten with a whip, but survives the ordeal, only to be shot and killed.

Cast

Main cast
 Peter Breck as Clay Culhane
 Russell Johnson as Marshal Gib Scott
 Anna-Lisa as Nora Travers
 J. Pat O'Malley as Judge Caleb Marsh
 Walter Burke as Tim Potter

Guest cast
Some of the Black Saddle guest stars include Chris Alcaide (who portrayed Clay Culhane in the original pilot), Fred Aldrich, John Anderson, Parley Baer, Raymond Bailey, Russ Bender, Paul Birch (in the role of U.S. President Ulysses S. Grant in the episode "Mr. Simpson"), Lane Bradford, Paul Burke, Archie Butler, James Coburn, Dennis Cross, John Dehner, Frank Dekova, Alan Dexter, Buddy Ebsen, Hampton Fancher,  Scott Forbes in Episode "Client: Steele"), James Franciscus, Jack Ging, Dabbs Greer, Robert Griffin, Clu Gulager, Robert Harland, Stacy Harris, Brett King, Jess Kirkpatrick, Robert Knapp, John Marley, Ken Mayer, Ann McCrea, Patrick McVey, James Parnell, Vic Perrin, Sam Reese, Stafford Repp, Bing Russell, Richard Rust, Simon Scott, Richard Shannon, Robert F. Simon, Quentin Sondergaard and Patrick Macnee.

Episodes

Season 1 (1959)

Season 2 (1959–60)

Production

Filming
Black Saddle was filmed at the Iverson Ranch in Chatsworth, California. Several years later, Peter Breck starred as Nick Barkley in another, more successful Four Star series, The Big Valley,  on ABC.

Scheduling
Black Saddle originally aired on NBC at 9 pm on Saturdays from January 10—May 30, 1959, before moving to ABC in October of that year, where it aired at 10:30 pm on Fridays after another Four Star production, The Detectives, starring Robert Taylor. Its competition on CBS was the interview program Person to Person created by Edward R. Murrow. NBC aired the 45-minute Gillette Cavalcade of Sports in the same time slot.

Theme
Although the Black Saddle TV series was cancelled over 50 years ago, its original theme tune, written by Herschel Burke Gilbert and Arthur Morton, has lived on and is still often performed. Many cover versions of the tune have been recorded; some of which are available on YouTube.

Syndication as The Westerners
For syndicated reruns, Black Saddle was combined with three other Western series from the same company: Law of the Plainsman starring Michael Ansara, Johnny Ringo starring Don Durant and Mark Goddard, and  The Westerner with Brian Keith, under the umbrella title, The Westerners, with new hosting sequences by Keenan Wynn.

References

External links

  
 Black Saddle at TVAddicts
 Black Saddle: Season 2, Ep.2 "The Saddle."

1959 American television series debuts
1960 American television series endings
NBC original programming
American Broadcasting Company original programming
Black-and-white American television shows
Television series by Four Star Television
Television series by 20th Century Fox Television
1950s Western (genre) television series
English-language television shows
Television shows set in Los Angeles
1960s Western (genre) television series
Television series about lawyers
Patricide in fiction